The following is a list of locomotives produced by General Motors Diesel (GMD), and its corporate successor Electro-Motive Canada (EMC).

The NF-110 and NF-210 locomotive models were narrow gauge locomotives for use on Canadian National Railway's Newfoundland lines, as are the  New Zealand DF class for use by Tranz Rail.

References

General Motors engines
GMD